Antoni-Djibu Milambo (born 3 April 2005) is a Dutch professional footballer who plays as a midfielder for the Eredivisie club Feyenoord.

Career
A youth product of SV DEHMusschen and SV Charlois, Milambo joined Feyenoord's academy in 2015. He signed his first professional contract with the club at the age of 15 on 15 October 2020. He made his professional debut for Feyenoord in a 3–0 UEFA Europa Conference League win over FC Luzern on 12 August 2021. At 16 and 131 days, Milambo became the club's youngest ever player taking the record from Georginio Wijnaldum.

International career
Born in the Netherlands, Milambo is of DR Congolese descent. He is a youth international for the Netherlands.

References

External links

Feyenoord Profile
Ons Oranje Profile

2005 births
Living people
Footballers from Rotterdam
Dutch footballers
Netherlands youth international footballers
Dutch people of Democratic Republic of the Congo descent
Feyenoord players
Association football midfielders